Pierre Gibaud (born 22 April 1988) is a French professional footballer who plays as a defender for  club Versailles.

References

External links
 
 
 Pierre Gibaud profile at foot-national.com

1988 births
Living people
Association football defenders
French footballers
Ligue 1 players
Ligue 2 players
Championnat National players
Championnat National 2 players
Championnat National 3 players
Stade Lavallois players
Le Mans FC players
Red Star F.C. players
USJA Carquefou players
FC Sochaux-Montbéliard players
Grenoble Foot 38 players
Le Havre AC players
FC Versailles 78 players
People from Laval, Mayenne
Sportspeople from Mayenne
Footballers from Pays de la Loire